The 2015 GCC Futsal Cup was the  second edition of the biennial Futsal competition. It took place in Bahrain in 2015.

Tournament

The six teams in the tournament played a single round-robin style competition. The four top teams advance to Semi-finals

Round-robin Results
https://www.goalzz.com/main.aspx?c=5942&stage=1&sch=true

Oman 2 : 6	Kuwait
			
Qatar 4 : 1	Saudi Arabia
	
Bahrain	0 : 1	United Arab Emirates

Qatar 4 : 3	Oman

Kuwait 3 : 1	United Arab Emirates

Bahrain 4 : 2	Saudi Arabia

Saudi Arabia	4 : 4	Kuwait
	
Oman	0 : 2	United Arab Emirates	
	
Bahrain	0 : 2	Qatar	
	
United Arab Emirates	2 : 2	Qatar	
	
Saudi Arabia	3 : 5	Oman	
	
Kuwait	6 : 1	Bahrain
	
Saudi Arabia	2 : 2	United Arab Emirates	
	
Qatar	2 : 4	Kuwait	
	
Oman	3 : 1	Bahrain

Knockouts

Semi-final

third-Place

Final

Result

References

2015
2015
2015 in Asian futsal
2014–15 in Saudi Arabian football
2014–15 in Bahraini football
2014–15 in Kuwaiti football
2014–15 in Qatari football
2014–15 in Emirati football
2014–15 in Omani football